Generation A is the thirteenth novel from Canadian novelist Douglas Coupland. It takes place in a near future, in a world in which bees have become extinct. The novel is told with a shifting-frame narrative perspective, shifting between the novel's five main protagonists. The novel mirrors the style of Coupland's first novel, Generation X: Tales for an Accelerated Culture, which is also a framed narrative. On September 30, 2009, Generation A was announced as a finalist for The Rogers Writers' Trust Fiction Prize by The Writer's Trust of Canada.

Synopsis

Coupland's website has a synopsis of the novel:

Characters

 Zack Lammle
 Zack is the first character to be stung by a bee. He is a corn farmer in Mahaska County, Iowa. He has Attention Deficit Disorder, and a fondness for cursing and acting against the social grain. For instance, when he is stung, he is currently carving a large image of a penis and testicles into his corn field, so that it could be photographed from space.
 Samantha Tolliver
 Samantha is the second character to be stung. She is from Palmerston North, Manawatū, New Zealand. Her parents had recently told her that they do not believe in anything anymore, such as God and religion. When she is stung, she is creating an Earth Sandwich, where two people place two slices of bread on exactly opposite sides of the planet using GPS coordinates. (The Earth Sandwich is in reference to a May 2006 challenge issued to viewers by Internet performance artist Ze Frank.).
 Julien Picard
 Julien is the third character to be stung. He was at the 12th Arrondissement in Paris, France. He was an avid World of Warcraft player whose characters had recently been deleted from the gaming world without notice or cause. He is the child of European intellectuals: his father works for CERN in Geneva. His disposition to the world is similar to Zack's, but he is more withdrawn from the world, where Zack embraces it.
 Diana Beaton
 Diana is the fourth character to be stung. She is from North Bay, Ontario. She has Tourette's, which leads her to have many strange outbursts of profanities. She claims that her Tourette's causes her to speak the truth about people, no matter how profane the truth is. She is stung in the moment in which she leaves her church over her priest's defense of an animal abuse.
 Harj Vetharanayan
 Harj is the last character to be stung. He is from Trincomalee, Sri Lanka. His family was washed away in the 2004 tsunami. He is working at a call center for Abercrombie & Fitch. He had created a prank commerce site which sold "silence" MP3s, which were bogus sound files of the putative silence in celebrity rooms . The New York Times was interviewing him at the moment of his sting, from the other side of the planet.

Style

The novel "mirrors the style" of Coupland's breakthrough first novel, Generation X: Tales for an Accelerated Culture The story is told through non-numbered chapters, just as the first was. The book is told with a shifting narrative perspective. Each chapter title announces whose perspective the rest of the chapter will be in. The book rotates in the order of Harj, Zack, Samantha, Julien, and Diana for most of the work. Some changes happen due to the plot.

The novel is also, like Generation X, a framed narrative. However, as this novel mirrors the style, the framed narrative style is also reflected. The first novel has stories in a frame, where the stories are the important part of the tale. In this novel, the stories help to bring out the characters. Throughout the novel, the importance of stories in a person's life is discussed, and in this novel, the stories are important only so much as they bring out and expand on the character's stories.

Title

The title is also a reference to Coupland's first novel, and it comes from a quote by Kurt Vonnegut. It is listed in an epigraph:

References

2009 Canadian novels
Novels by Douglas Coupland
Postmodern novels
Novels set in Iowa
Novels set in New Zealand
Novels set in Paris
Novels set in Northern Ontario
Novels set in Sri Lanka
Random House books